Hayes Hill is a small scoria cone in Donnybrook, approximately 30 km north of Melbourne, Victoria, Australia.
It is on the eastern edge of the Newer Volcanics Province.

Hayes Hill is considered a regionally significant geological site as a source of the lava flows that follow the ancestral Merri and Darebin Creeks and Yarra River through the northern suburbs of Melbourne into the CBD.

References

Volcanoes of Victoria (Australia)
Inactive volcanoes